Confirmation is a 2016 American television political thriller film, directed by Rick Famuyiwa and written by Susannah Grant. It is about Clarence Thomas' Supreme Court nomination hearings, and the controversy that unfolded when Anita Hill alleged she was sexually harassed by Thomas. It stars Kerry Washington as Hill and Wendell Pierce as Clarence Thomas, with Erika Christensen, Jennifer Hudson, Greg Kinnear, Jeffrey Wright, Bill Irwin, and Eric Stonestreet in supporting roles. The film aired on HBO on April 16, 2016.

Plot
Anita Hill, a law professor at the University of Oklahoma, is contacted and questioned about Clarence Thomas. Hill, a former employee of Thomas, is prompted to speak about his workplace treatment. Anita Hill tells the Senate Judiciary Committee that, inter alia, Clarence Thomas had spoken to her about pornographic movies and actors such as Long Dong Silver. A psychologist tells a U.S. senator that Anita Hill has erotomania.

A hearing takes place at which Anita tells the Senate Judiciary Committee that, inter alia, Clarence Thomas sexually harassed her 10 years prior. From there, a slew of events unfolds as the Committee tries to determine who is telling the truth, with the world watching. The subpoena to Angela Wright, another accuser of Thomas, is withdrawn.

Cast
 Kerry Washington as Anita Hill
 Wendell Pierce as Clarence Thomas
 Greg Kinnear as Joe Biden, U.S. Senator (D-DE)
 Jeffrey Wright as Charles Ogletree
 Eric Stonestreet as Kenneth Duberstein, former White House Chief of Staff
 Kristen Ariza as Judy Smith, White House Deputy Press Secretary.
 Bill Irwin as John Danforth, U.S. Senator (R-MO)
 Zoe Lister-Jones as Carolyn Hart, aide to Senator Biden
 Grace Gummer as Ricki Seidman, aide to Senator Kennedy
 Dylan Baker as Orrin Hatch, U.S. Senator (R-UT)
 Treat Williams as Ted Kennedy, U.S. Senator (D-MA)
 Erika Christensen as Shirley Wiegand, friend of Anita Hill
 Alison Wright as Ginni Thomas, Thomas' wife
 Malcolm Gets as Arlen Specter, U.S. Senator (R-PA)
 Peter McRobbie as Alan K. Simpson, U.S. Senator (R-WY)
 Kimberly Elise as Sonia Jarvis
 Jennifer Hudson as Angela Wright
 Tom Virtue as Patrick Leahy, U.S. Senator (D-VT)
 Jan Radcliff as Pat Schroeder, U.S. Representative (D-CO) 
 Frank Hoyt Taylor as Strom Thurmond, U.S. Senator (R-SC)
 Matthew Hennessy as an aide to U.S. Senator Joseph I. Lieberman.

Production

Casting
On March 12, 2015, it was announced that Kerry Washington would star as Anita Hill in an HBO television film. Washington's role on ABC Network's hit television show Scandal was loosely based on Judy Smith, who appears as a character in the film. On April 28, Wendell Pierce was cast as Clarence Thomas. On May 12, Eric Stonestreet joined as Kenneth Duberstein. Greg Kinnear, Jennifer Hudson, and Jeffrey Wright were reported to have joined the cast as Joe Biden, Angela Wright, and Charles Ogletree, respectively, on May 29. On June 5, Bill Irwin and Treat Williams were added, to respectively portray John Danforth and Ted Kennedy. Later that same day, Erika Christensen, Cobie Smulders, Dylan Baker, and Grace Gummer were announced as cast as Shirley Wiegand, Biden aide Harriet Grant, Orrin Hatch, and Ricki Seidman, respectively. On June 16, Kimberly Elise, Kristen Ariza, and Malcolm Gets joined the cast, as Sonia Jarvis, Judy Smith, and Arlen Specter, respectively. On July 2, Daniel Sauli was cast as Mark Paoletta. On July 9, it was reported that Smulders had exited the film due to breaking her leg; Zoe Lister-Jones replaced her in the Harriet Grant role (a composite of aides to Biden).

Filming
Principal photography began in Atlanta, Georgia on June 14, 2015, and was completed on July 24.

Actual news footage taped by CNN of United States Senate staff during the lead-up to the hearings was used, to give the film a more realistic tone.

Reception
Confirmation received mostly positive reviews from critics, who praised Washington's performance as Hill and the film's depiction of its subject matter. The review aggregator website Rotten Tomatoes gave the film an approval rating of 79%, based on 39 reviews, with an average rating of 6.7/10. The site's critical consensus reads, "Stellar performances and gripping subject matter help Confirmation overcome production values that occasionally feel as dated as the infamous real-life case it covers." On Metacritic, the film has a score of 72 out of 100, based on 25 critics, indicating "generally favorable reviews."

Awards and nominations

Credits
During the film credits, the onscreen text states that as a result of Hill's accusation of sexual harassment, more women were elected to public office in 1992 than previous periods, official sexual harassment complaints doubled, and an important workplace discrimination law was passed (referring to the Civil Rights Act of 1991).

See also
Strange Justice

References

External links

2016 television films
2016 films
African-American films
African-American biographical dramas
Cultural depictions of Joe Biden
Drama films based on actual events
Films scored by Harry Gregson-Williams
Films set in the 1990s
Films shot in Atlanta
Films shot in Georgia (U.S. state)
Films with screenplays by Susannah Grant
HBO Films films
Films directed by Rick Famuyiwa
2010s feminist films
American drama television films
2010s English-language films
2010s American films